Huyshe is both a surname and a given name. Notable people with the name include:

Oliver Huyshe (1885–1960), English cricketer
Huyshe Yeatman-Biggs (1845–1922), English Anglican bishop